Dulce Nombre de Maria Cathedral Basilica is a Roman Catholic cathedral in Guam. It is the seat of the archbishop of the Roman Catholic Archdiocese of Agaña. It is located on the site where the island's first Catholic church was constructed in 1669, under the guidance of Padre San Vitores. The present building looms above the palm trees and is a familiar landmark in downtown Hagåtña. The basilica enshrines the image of Santa Marian Kamalen, Patroness of Guam.

History
The church was the focal site around which the administrative buildings were built. Built under the direction of Padre Diego Luís de San Vitores, with the assistance of the Chamorros of Hagåtña, it was dedicated on February 2, 1669.

Queen Maria Ana donated 300 pesos and Chief Quipuha of Hagåtña contributed the land. In 1670 a more permanent structure was erected. Built of coral stones with the technique of mamposteria, this structural foundation expanded to become the cathedral. Within this structure were walls, ceilings and floors constructed of ifil wood. A fresco on the rear wall depicted the Assumption of the Blessed Virgin Mary. The original cathedral was destroyed by bombardment during the 1944 Second Battle of Guam.

According to historian Benigno Palomo, in 1669, one of the main missions of the Spanish soldiers and missionaries was to exalt "the Catholic faith" and that "the people living in islands and land of this sort, you will and ought to bring to the Christian religion", from the Bill of Partition issued by Pope Alexander VI.

Other churches were built at Funa near Umatac, at Tepungan by Asan, at Ritidian, at Tarrague, at Dededo and at Orote. Initially, many of these churches were destroyed by the Chamorros in their effort to regain their independence. Others were destroyed by natural causes. Over the years, the Chamorros gradually accepted the faith of the Spanish as their own.

Before the war, there were nine churches and 22 chapels throughout Guam. These chapels were little sanctuaries between villages where one could privately pray during the long journey to and from home. All were destroyed during World War II except San Dionisio at Umatac, San Jose at Inarajan and San Francisco at Yona.

The cathedral-basilica serves as local landmark and is home to a community of parishioners who regularly attend Sunday Masses, sacred liturgies and annual events. It is also a place where Guam's visitors embrace the island's rich Catholic history and identity.

The National Museum of the Dulce Nombre de Maria is located above the Chapel of St. Therese of Lisieux. The museum features changing displays of inspirational art created by local artists.

References

External links 
 

Buildings and structures in Hagåtña, Guam
Roman Catholic cathedrals in Guam
Basilica churches in Oceania
Roman Catholic churches completed in 1959
20th-century Roman Catholic church buildings in the United States
Museums in Guam
Art museums and galleries in Guam
Religious museums in the United States
1959 establishments in Guam
Roman Catholic Archdiocese of Agaña